The 1978 Hawaii State Constitutional Convention is considered the watershed political event in the modern State of Hawaii. It was convened on July 5, 1978.  The convention established term limits for state office holders, provided a requirement for an annual balanced budget, laid the groundwork for the return of federal land such as the island of Kahoolawe, and most importantly created the Office of Hawaiian Affairs in an effort to right the wrongs done towards native Hawaiians since the overthrow of the Kingdom of Hawaii in 1893.  The event also created an ambitious project of preservation of the Hawaiian culture including the adoption of Hawaiian diacritical marks for official usage, use of Hawaiian names, etc.  The Hawaiian language became the official state language of Hawaii for the first time since the overthrow.

Based upon language the US Supreme Court had used to legalize abortion and birth control, the convention added the text: "the right of the people to privacy is recognized and shall not be infringed without the showing of a compelling state interest." This text makes the state constitution one of only five in the US that explicitly define a right to privacy.

A major outgrowth of the constitutional convention was the launching of the political careers of those who would later dominate Hawaiian politics.  Delegates to the convention included:

 Carol Fukunaga, future legislative leader
 Helene Hale, future legislative leader
 Jeremy Harris, future Mayor of Honolulu
 Les Ihara, Jr., future legislative leader
 Barbara Marumoto, future legislative leader
 Joseph M. Souki, future Speaker of the House
 John David Waiheʻe III, future Governor
 Charlene Hoe, Windward Oʻahu delegate and founder of Hakipuʻu Learning Center

References

External links 

 Proceedings of the 1978 Constitutional Convention - Volume I
 Proceedings of the 1978 Constitutional Convention - Volume II

Constitution of Hawaii
Hawaii State Constitutional Convention, 1978
Hawaii
Native Hawaiian history
Legal history of Hawaii
Indigenous land rights in Hawaii
Constitutional Convention
1978 in law
Official languages